Ieuan Lewis (by 1511 – 1597?), of Gladestry, Radnorshire, was a Welsh politician.

He was a Member (MP) of the Parliament of England for Radnorshire in 1558 and 1559.

References

1597 deaths
16th-century Welsh politicians
People from Radnorshire
English MPs 1558
English MPs 1559
Year of birth uncertain